Prime Air may refer to:
  Amazon Air, a US cargo airline based in Cincinnati, Ohio, operating under the callsign "Prime Air"
  Amazon Prime Air, a possible future drone delivery service
  Prime Airlines, a defunct British airline